Brooke Wyckoff (born March 30, 1980) is an American former professional basketball player and current Head Coach at Florida State University.

A 6'1" forward from Florida State, Wyckoff played in the WNBA from 2001 to 2009, competing for the Orlando Miracle, the Connecticut Sun, and the Chicago Sky.

Brooke played 132 games for the Sun, where she's remembered for the clutch three-pointer she hit in the final seconds of Game 2 of the 2005 WNBA Finals against the Sacramento Monarchs at Mohegan Sun Arena. That shot sent the game to overtime.

She played for Estudiantes in Spain during the 2008–09 WNBA off-season.

She tore her ACL and decided to retire following the 2009 season. She's been an assistant coach on the Florida State women’s basketball staff since June 2011. Prior to that, she spent two years as an assistant girls’ basketball coach at Lakota East High in Cincinnati.

USA Basketball
Wyckoff played on the team presenting the USA at the 1999 World University Games held in Palma de Mallorca, Spain. The team had a 4–2 record and earned the silver medal. Wyckoff averaged 7.0 points per game and led the team in rebounding, with 7.0 per game.

She competed with USA Basketball as a member of the 2000 Jones Cup Team that won the Gold in Taipei.

Coaching record

Florida State Statistics 
Source:

References

External links
FSU profile
Profile at WNBA.com

1980 births
Living people
American expatriate basketball people in Spain
American women's basketball coaches
American women's basketball players
Basketball players from Illinois
Chicago Sky players
Connecticut Sun players
Florida State Seminoles women's basketball coaches
Florida State Seminoles women's basketball players
Orlando Miracle players
Small forwards
Sportspeople from Lake Forest, Illinois
Universiade medalists in basketball
Universiade silver medalists for the United States
Medalists at the 1999 Summer Universiade